Calamaria schlegeli is a species of snake in the family Colubridae. The species is known commonly as the red-headed reed snake, white-headed reed snake, and pink-headed reed snake. It is native to Southeast Asia, where it occurs in Brunei, Indonesia, Malaysia, and Singapore.

Etymology
The specific name, schlegeli, is in honor of German herpetologist Hermann Schlegel.

Identification

The key identification characters for C. schlegeli are modified maxillary teeth and scale characteristics. The third and fourth upper lip scales touch the eye. The mental scale does not touch the anterior chin shields. The nasal scales are oriented laterally. There is considerable geographic variation. Preocular scales are present in snakes from Singapore and Malaya, but absent in those from Java, and sometimes present on those from Borneo and Sumatra.

This nonvenomous red-headed snake is sometimes confused with the blue Malayan coral snake (Calliophis bivirgatus) and the red-headed krait (Bungarus flaviceps), which are venomous.

Biology
C. schlegeli lives in forest undergrowth. It sometimes emerges on paths and in yards and gardens. It burrows for cover and feeds on small prey such as worms and insects.

References

Further reading
Boulenger GA (1894). Catalogue of the Snakes in the British Museum (Natural History). Volume II., Containing the Conclusion of the Colubridæ Aglyphæ. London: Trustees of the British Museum (Natural History). (Taylor and Francis, printers). xi + 382 pp. + Plates I-XX. ("Calamaria schlegelii [sic]", p. 345).
Das I (2006). A Photographic Guide to Snakes and Other Reptiles of Borneo. Sanibel Island, Florida: Ralph Curtis Books. 143 pp. . (Calamaria schlegeli, p. 27).
Duméril A-M-C, Bibron G, Duméril A[-H-A] (1854). Erpétologie générale ou histoire naturelle complète des reptiles. Tome septième. Première partie. Comprenant l'histoire des serpents non venimeux. [= General Herpetology or Complete Natural History of the Reptiles, Volume 7. First Part, Containing the Natural History of Nonvenomous Snakes]. Paris: Roret. xvi + 780 pp. (Calamaria schlegeli, new species, pp. 81–83). (in French).

schlegeli
Colubrids
Reptiles described in 1854
Taxa named by André Marie Constant Duméril
Taxa named by Gabriel Bibron
Taxa named by Auguste Duméril